The bilabial clicks are a family of click consonants that sound like a smack of the lips. They are found as phonemes only in the small Tuu language family (currently two languages, one moribund), in the ǂ’Amkoe language of Botswana (also moribund), and in the extinct Damin ritual jargon of Australia. However, bilabial clicks are found paralinguistically for a kiss in various languages, including integrated into a greeting in the Hadza language of Tanzania, and as allophones of labial–velar stops in some West African languages (Ladefoged 1968), as of /mw/ in some of the languages neighboring Shona, such as Ndau and Tonga.

This may be combined with a second letter to indicate the manner of articulation, though this is commonly omitted for tenuis clicks.

In official IPA transcription, the click letter is combined with a  via a tie bar, though  is frequently omitted. Either letter, whether baseline or superscript, is usually placed before the click letter, but may come after when the release of the velar or uvular occlusion is audible. A third convention is the click letter with diacritics for voicelessness, voicing and nasalization; it does not distinguish velar from uvular labial clicks. Common labial clicks are:

The last is what is heard in the sound sample at right, as non-native speakers tend to glottalize clicks to avoid nasalizing them.
 
Damin also had an egressive bilabial , which may be an egressive click (if it is not buccal) and which is always followed by another consonant (or ).

Features
Features of ingressive labial clicks:

The forward place of articulation is labial, which means it is articulated with the lips. The release is a noisy, affricate-like sound. Bilabial articulation, using both lips, is typical. Sometimes this may pass through a labio-dental stage as the click is released, making it noisier. In other cases, the lower lip may start out in contact with both the upper teeth and the upper lip.

 (One of the two labial clicks in Damin is lingual egressive, which means that the trapped air pocket is compressed by the tongue until it is allowed to spurt out through the lips.)

The labial clicks are sometimes erroneously described as sounding like a kiss. However, they do not have the pursed lips of a kiss.

Symbol
The bullseye or bull's eye  symbol used in phonetic transcription of the phoneme was made an official part of the International Phonetic Alphabet in 1979, but had existed for at least 50 years earlier.

Similar graphemes consisting of a circled dot encoded by Unicode are:
Gothic 𐍈, hwair
astronomical symbol ☉ "Sun"
mathematical operators  and 
geometrical symbol 
Cyrillic Ꙩ, ꙩ (monocular O)

Occurrence
English does not have a labial click (or any click consonant, for that matter) as a phoneme, but a plain bilabial click does occur in mimesis, as a lip-smacking sound children use to imitate a fish.

Labial clicks only occur in the Tuu and Kx'a families of southern Africa, and in the Australian ritual language Damin.

Origins
Labial clicks may have arisen historically from labialization of other places of articulation.

See also
Alveolar click
Dental click
Lateral click
Palatal click
Retroflex click
List of phonetics topics

Notes

References

External links

 

Bilabial consonants
Phonetic transcription symbols
Click consonants